Greg Lawrence is a Canadian politician elected to represent the electoral district of Moose Jaw Wakamow in the Legislative Assembly of Saskatchewan in the 2011 election. He is a member of the Saskatchewan Party.

References

External links
Sask Party Profile

Saskatchewan Party MLAs
Living people
Canadian people of Danish descent
1966 births
People from Estevan
21st-century Canadian politicians
Métis politicians
Canadian Métis people